The RS-83 was a rocket engine design for a reusable liquid hydrogen/liquid oxygen rocket larger and more powerful than any other.  The RS-83 was designed to last 100 missions, and was intended for use on the first stage of a two-stage-to-orbit reusable launch vehicle.

Development 
It was developed by Rocketdyne Propulsion and Power, located in Canoga Park, California to power the launch vehicle as part of the Space Launch Initiative (SLI) program.

The engine was designed to use many new technologies including ones developed for the Space Shuttle Main Engine (SSME).  Technologies include channel wall regenerative nozzles, hydrostatic bearings, and turbine damping.

The RS-83 is loosely based on the RS-68 that powers the Delta IV expendable launch vehicle. The RS-83 design is more efficient, lighter, slightly stronger, and yet reusable.

One of the main goals of SLI was to develop components of a reusable launch vehicle with high reliability.  The RS-83 was designed for a loss of vehicle rate of 1 in 1,000.  Another goal of the program was to dramatically reduce the cost per unit weight of payload to low earth orbit.  The RS-83 was designed with the goal of $1,000/lb ($2,200/kg).

The engine passed numerous design reviews and was on schedule for prototype testing in 2005 before the SLI program was cancelled.  NASA changed its focus to expendable launch systems used in the Constellation program for human spaceflights to the Moon and Mars.

See also 
 J-2 (rocket engine)
 RS-84

References

External links 
Stennis Space Center page.

Rocket engines using the gas-generator cycle
Rocketdyne engines
Rocket engines using hydrogen propellant
Rocket engines of the United States